The following is the 1972–73 network television schedule for the three major English language commercial broadcast networks in the United States. The schedule covers primetime hours from September 1972 through August 1973. The schedule is followed by a list per network of returning series, new series, and series cancelled after the 1971–72 season. All times are Eastern and Pacific, with certain exceptions, such as Monday Night Football.

New fall series are highlighted in bold.

Each of the 30 highest-rated shows is listed with its rank and rating as determined by Nielsen Media Research.

 Yellow indicates the programs in the top 10 for the season.
 Cyan indicates the programs in the top 20 for the season.
 Magenta indicates the programs in the top 30 for the season.

Note: This was the first full season in which all networks, on every day of the week except for Sunday, started airing programs at 8:00 instead of 7:30, as dictated by the FCC under its Prime Time Access Rule, intended to increase diversity in programming.

PBS is not included; member stations have local flexibility over most of their schedules and broadcast times for network shows may vary.

Sunday 

Note: 60 Minutes aired at 6:00-7:00 pm on CBS from January to June 1973.

Monday

Tuesday

Wednesday 

Note: Dan August consisted of reruns of the 1970-1971 ABC series.

Thursday

Friday 

Note: Ghost Story was retooled slightly and retitled Circle of Fear (under the same production team) with the episode broadcast January 5, 1973.

Saturday

By network

ABC

Returning Series
The ABC Sunday Night Movie
ABC Movie of the Week
Alias Smith and Jones
The Brady Bunch
The Corner Bar
The F.B.I.
Love, American Style
Marcus Welby, M.D.
The Mod Squad
Monday Night Football
The Odd Couple
Owen Marshall, Counselor at Law
The Partridge Family
Room 222
The Sixth Sense

New Series
The Burns and Schreiber Comedy Hour *
Here We Go Again *
The Julie Andrews Hour
Kung Fu
Love Thy Neighbor *
The Men: Assignment Vienna / The Delphi Bureau / Jigsaw
The Paul Lynde Show
The Rookies
The Strauss Family *
The Streets of San Francisco
Temperatures Rising
Thicker than Water *
A Touch of Grace *

Not returning from 1971–72:
The ABC Comedy Hour
Bewitched
The Courtship of Eddie's Father
Getting Together
The Ken Berry "Wow" Show
Longstreet
The Man and the City
The Marty Feldman Comedy Machine
Monday Night Special
Nanny and the Professor
The Persuaders!
Shirley's World
The Smith Family
The Super

CBS

Returning Series
60 Minutes
All in the Family
Cannon
The Carol Burnett Show
The Doris Day Show
Gunsmoke
Hawaii Five-O
Here's Lucy
Mannix
The Mary Tyler Moore Show
Medical Center
Mission: Impossible
The New CBS Tuesday Night Movies
The New Dick Van Dyke Show
The Sonny & Cher Comedy Hour
CBS Thursday Night Movie

New Series
Anna and the King
Barnaby Jones *
The Bob Newhart Show
Bridget Loves Bernie
M*A*S*H
Maude
The New Bill Cosby Show
The Sandy Duncan Show
The Waltons

Not returning from 1971–72:
Arnie
Bearcats!
Cade's County
The Chicago Teddy Bears
The David Steinberg Show
The Don Rickles Show
Funny Face
The Glen Campbell Goodtime Hour
The Jerry Reed When You're Hot You're Hot Hour
The John Byner Comedy Hour
The Life of Leonardo da Vinci
Me and the Chimp
My Three Sons
O'Hara, U.S. Treasury
Suspense Theatre

NBC

Returning Series
Adam-12
The Bold Ones
Bonanza
Columbo
The Dean Martin Show
Emergency!
First Tuesday
The Flip Wilson Show
Ironside
McCloud
McMillan & Wife
Monday Night Baseball
NBC Action Playhouse
NBC Monday Night at the Movies
The NBC Mystery Movie
NBC Saturday Night at the Movies
Night Gallery
Rowan & Martin's Laugh-In
Sanford and Son
The Wonderful World of Disney

New Series
Banacek
Banyon
The Bobby Darin Show
Cool Million
Dean Martin Presents Music Country *
Escape *
Ghost Story/Circle of Fear
Hec Ramsey
The Helen Reddy Show *
The Little People/The Brian Keith Show 
Love Thy Neighbor
Madigan
The Magician *
NBC Reports
Search

Not returning from 1971–72:
The D.A.
Dean Martin Presents the Bobby Darin Amusement Co.
The Funny Side'The Good LifeThe Jimmy Stewart ShowNBC ReportsNicholsThe PartnersSargeNote: The * indicates that the program was introduced in midseason.

References

Additional sources
 Castleman, H. & Podrazik, W. (1982). Watching TV: Four Decades of American Television. New York: McGraw-Hill. 314 pp.
 McNeil, Alex. Total Television. Fourth edition. New York: Penguin Books. .
 Brooks, Tim & Marsh, Earle (1985). The Complete Directory to Prime Time Network TV Shows'' (3rd ed.). New York: Ballantine. .

United States primetime network television schedules
1972 in American television
1973 in American television